This French composer Daniel François Esprit Auber (1782–1871) is best known for his operas, including 31 opéras comiques, 7 opéras, 3 drames lyriques, and one each of works designated as comédie, comédie mêlée de chant, intermède, opéra féerie, opéra historique, scène lyrique and scène-prologue. All were premiered in Paris, except Jean de Couvain, which was premiered in Chimay (now in Belgium), and La fête de Versailles, which was premiered in Versailles.

List of operas

References

Notes

Sources
 Pitou, Spire (1990). The Paris Opéra: An Encyclopedia of Operas, Ballets, Composers, and Performers. Growth and Grandeur, 1815–1914. Westport, Connecticut: Greenwood Press. .
 Schneider, Herbert (1992). "Auber, Daniel-François-Esprit" in The New Grove Dictionary of Opera, ed. Stanley Sadie. London: Macmillan. .
 Walsh, T. J. (1981). Second Empire Opera: The Théâtre Lyrique, Paris, 1851–1870. London: John Calder. .
 Wild, Nicole; Charlton, David (2005). Théâtre de l'Opéra-Comique Paris: répertoire 1762-1972. Sprimont, Belgium: Editions Mardaga. .
Some of the information in this article was originally taken from the Dutch Wikipedia article.

External links
 
 "Catalogue des oeuvres", list of works, Musicologie.org, accessed 30 October 2009 

 
Lists of operas by composer
Lists of compositions by composer